Gilles Gobeil (born September 27, 1954) is an electroacoustic music composer from Sorel-Tracy, Quebec, Canada, and currently living in Montreal, Quebec, Canada. Gobeil received his musical education at the Université de Montréal (Mmus in Composition).

His works have been performed in concerts throughout Canada and abroad. Gilles Gobeil is a member of the Canadian Electroacoustic Community (CEC), Associate Composer of the Canadian Music Centre (CMC) and co-founder of the concert organization Réseaux.

Laureate on the international scene: Métamorphoses Biennal Acousmatic Composition Competition (Belgium, 2002, 2000); CIMESP (International Electroacoustic Music Contest of São Paulo, Brazil, 2001, 1999, 97); Ciber@rt (Valencia, Spain, 1999); Bourges International Electroacoustic Music Competition (France, 1999, 89, 88); Stockholm Electronic Arts Award (Sweden, 1997, 94); Ars Electronica, Linz (Austria, 1995); Luigi Russolo International Competition, Varese (Italy, 1989, 88, 87); Newcomp Computer Music Competition (USA, 1987); and Brock University Tape Music Competition, St Catharines (Canada, 1985). Other honors in national competitions: 1993 Grand Prize from SOCAN (the Canadian performing rights society); 1985 Robert Fleming Prize from the Canadian Music Council; and Composition Award from PROCAN (a former Canadian performing rights society) in 1984.

Recordings

 Trilogie d'ondes (empreintes DIGITALes, IMED 0576, 2005)
 Le contrat with René Lussier (empreintes DIGITALes, IMED 0372, 2003)
  dans le silence de la nuit (empreintes DIGITALes, IMED 0155, 2001)
 La mécanique des ruptures (empreintes DIGITALes, IMED 9421, 1994)

List of works

 Associations libres (1990), electric guitar, and tape
 Le contrat (1996–2003)
 Derrière la porte la plus éloignée (1998)
 Éclats de perle (2002)
 Entre les deux rives du printemps (2006)
 Là où vont les nuages (1990–91), ondes Martenot, interactive system, and tape
 Nous sommes heureux de (1992)
 Nuit cendre (1995)
 Ombres, espaces, silences (2005)
 La perle et l'oubli (1999–2002), ondes Martenot, and tape
 Point de passage (1997)
 Projet Proust (1995, 2001)
 Rivage (1986)
 Soledad (1998, 2000), guitar, and tape
 Traces (1985)
 Le vertige inconnu (1993–94)
 La ville machine (1992)
 Voix blanche (1988–89), ondes Martenot, and tape

See also
 Music of Canada
 List of Canadian composers

References
 Paland, Ralph. 2009. "Gilles Gobeil". Komponisten der Gegenwart (KDG), 40. Nachlieferung (11/2009), Munich 2009. pp. 1–2; 
 _. "In akusmatischer Nacht: Elektroakustische Proust-Bilder franko-kanadischer Komponisten im poetologischen Kontext der Musique acousmatique." Marcel Proust und die Musik: Beiträge des Symposions der Marcel Proust Gesellschaft in Wien im November 2009. edited $$by Albert Gier. Berlin: Insel Verlag, 2012. pp. 233–284. 
 http://www.electrocd.com/en/bio/gobeil_gi/ (with permission)

External links
 His biography on electrocd.com

Living people
Electroacoustic music composers
Canadian composers
Canadian male composers
1954 births